Jumah Sambou (born 21 November 2001) is a professional rugby league footballer who plays as a er  for St Helens (Heritage № 1271) in the Betfred Super League.

Sambou made his first team début for Saints in April 2022 against the Castleford Tigers.

References

External links
St Helens profile
Saints Heritage Society profile
SL profile

2001 births
Living people
English rugby league players
Rugby league players from Warrington
Rugby league wingers
St Helens R.F.C. players